The 1938 Detroit Lions season was their ninth in the league. The team matched their previous season's output of 7–4. They failed to qualify for the playoffs for the third consecutive season.

Offseason

Draft

Schedule

Note: Intra-division opponents are in bold text.

Standings

References

External links 
1938 Detroit Lions at Pro Football Reference
1938 Detroit Lions at jt-sw.com
1938 Detroit Lions at The Football Database

Detroit Lions seasons
Detroit Lions
Detroit Lions